Pomacentrus simsiang, the blueback damsel, is a damselfish from the Indo-West Pacific. It occasionally makes its way into the aquarium trade. It grows to a size of 7 cm in length.

References

 

simsiang
Taxa named by Pieter Bleeker
Fish described in 1856